Argyroploce externa is a species of moth, belonging to the genus Argyroploce.

It is native to Europe and Northern America.

References

Olethreutini